Mangelia densilineata is a species of sea snail, a marine gastropod mollusk in the family Mangeliidae.

Description

Distribution
This marine species occurs off Baja California, Mexico.

References

External links
 ITIS: Mangelia densilineata

densilineata
Gastropods described in 1921